Ahmadullah Wasiq is an Afghan politician currently the deputy head of the cultural commission of the Islamic Emirate of Afghanistan. Since 25 October 2021 he is also serving as Deputy Central Spokesman of the Islamic Emirate of Afghanistan alongside Inamullah Samangani and Maulvi Asadullah (Bilal Karimi). He is from Ghazni Province.

On 26 August 2021, Wasiq, along with Anas Haqqani, visited the Afghanistan Cricket Board. They met with cricket board officials and national players and assured them of all possible cooperation for the promotion of cricket.

Al Emara Press Reporter 
Throughout early 2020 to mid 2021, Ahmadullah appeared as the host of Al Emara frequently interviewing Taliban figures around Taliban-controlled territories throughout the country. It is believed that he has a significant importance in the Taliban's media offices along with Abdul Qahar Balkhi.

See also
 Politics of Afghanistan
 Sher Mohammad Abbas Stanikzai
 Anas Haqqani
 Abdul Qahar Balkhi
 Suhail Shaheen
 Zabiullah Mujahid
 Tariq Ghazniwal

References

External links
 

Year of birth missing (living people)
Living people
Taliban leaders
Afghan politicians
Taliban spokespersons